Doncaster railport may refer to:

Doncaster International Railport, opened in 1995
Doncaster iPort, opened in 2018